I soliti idioti: Il film is a 2011 Italian film directed by Enrico Lando, based on the comedy series of the same name.

A sequel film entitled I 2 soliti idioti was released on 20 December 2012.

Cast
Francesco Mandelli as Ruggero De Ceglie / Various
Fabrizio Biggio as Gianluca De Ceglie / Various
Francesco Sarcina as Fregone
Mădălina Diana Ghenea as Messalina / Irina Tjianchikova
Miriam Leone as TV reporter
Valeria Bilello as brothel girl
Marco Foschi as Remo
Gianmarco Tognazzi as De Peverelli
Elisabetta De Palo as Marika
Cristina Del Basso as Enrica
Rocco Tanica as Luigi
Carlotta Maggiorana as Emma
Verdena as Sebastiano's friends

References

External links

2011 films
Films directed by Enrico Lando
Italian comedy films
2010s Italian-language films
2010 comedy films
2010s Italian films